Guido Tendas (born 17 July 1950 in Solarussa) is an Italian politician.

He is a member of the Democratic Party.

He was elected Mayor of Oristano on 25 June 2012 and took office on 26 June. In 2017 he refused to run for a second term.

See also
2012 Italian local elections
List of mayors of Oristano

References

External links
 

1950 births
Living people
Mayors of Oristano
Democratic Party (Italy) politicians